Norkett Branch is a  long 2nd order tributary to Lanes Creek in Union County, North Carolina.  This is the only stream of this name in the United States.

Course
Norkett Branch rises about 4 miles southwest of Sturdivants Crossroads, North Carolina.  Norkett Branch then flows generally north with curves to meet Lanes Creek about 1 mile northwest of Sturdivants Crossroads, North Carolina.

Watershed
Norkett Branch drains  of area, receives about 48.3 in/year of precipitation, has a topographic wetness index of 465.89 and is about 40% forested.

References

Rivers of North Carolina
Rivers of Union County, North Carolina
Tributaries of the Pee Dee River